The 2012 Carleton Heights Women's Cash was held from September 6 to 9 at the Carleton Heights Curling Club in Ottawa, Ontario as part of the 2012–13 Ontario Curling Tour. The event was held in a round robin format.

Teams

Round-robin standings

Tiebreakers

Playoffs

Carleton Heights Women's Cash
Curling in Ottawa
Carleton Heights Women's Cash
September 2012 sports events in Canada
2010s in Ottawa